The Ven. Dr Arnold Thaddeus Hollis was Archdeacon of Bermuda from 1996 to 2004; and is now Archdeacon Emeritus.

Dyson was educated at The Richard Stockton College of New Jersey and Codrington College and ordained in 1959. After a curacy at St. John the Baptist Church, Wakefield, New Hampshire he served incumbencies at Berbice, Horbury, Loughton and Sandys before his appointment as Archdeacon.

References

1933 births
Stockton University alumni
Alumni of Codrington College
20th-century Anglican priests
21st-century Anglican priests
Archdeacons of Bermuda
Living people